The 1980 South Africa rugby union tour of South America was a series of six matches played by the South Africa national rugby union team (the Springboks) in Paraguay, Uruguay and Chile in October 1980. The South Africa team won all six of their matches including both test matches against the South American Jaguars.

The tour was a reciprocal visit for the South American Jaguars tour to South Africa earlier in 1980 and the two test matches were originally scheduled to be played in Argentina. The Argentine government subsequently banned the South Africans from visiting Argentina in protest at the South African government's apartheid policies and the internationals were re-arranged for Uruguay and Chile. The South American side was composed entirely of Argentine players.

South Africa's touring party included Errol Tobias, the first non-white player to represent the Springboks.

Matches

Touring party

Manager: J. Pretorius
Assistant Manager: Nelie Smith
Captain: Morné du Plessis

Backs

Forwards

References

South Africa rugby union tour
South Africa national rugby union team tours
Rugby union tours of Paraguay
Rugby union tours of Chile
Rugby union tours of Uruguay
tour
Rugby union and apartheid
1980 in Chilean sport
1980 in Uruguayan sport